Greg Robinson may refer to:
Greg Robinson (offensive tackle) (born 1992), American football offensive tackle
Greg Robinson (American football coach) (1951–2022), American football coach
Greg Robinson (running back) (born 1969), American football running back
Gregory L. Robinson (born about 1960), director of the James Webb Space Telescope

See also
Greg Robinson-Randall or Greg Randall (born 1978), American football offensive tackle
Craig Robinson (disambiguation)